"La Guaneña" is a Colombian song in the bambuco genre. The song is attributed to Nicanor Díaz. In its list of the 50 best Colombian songs of all time, El Tiempo, Colombia's most widely circulated newspaper, ranked it No. 1 as the best Colombian song of all time and called it the first bambuco. 

La Guaneña has been recorded by many artists including the following:

 Chimizapagua
 Don Medardo y sus Players
 Génesis
 Los Sabandeños
 Eddy Martínez
 Lisandro Meza
 Julio Atahualpa Poalasín
 Oriol Rangel

References

External links
 La Guaneña at Spanish Wikipedia

Colombian songs